Martin Westerberg (13 May 1892 – 3 October 1963) was a Swedish architect. His work was part of the architecture event in the art competition at the 1932 Summer Olympics.

References

1892 births
1963 deaths
20th-century Swedish architects
Olympic competitors in art competitions
Artists from Stockholm